Ponsworthy is a hamlet on the eastern side of Dartmoor, Devon, England.

Its row of picturesque thatched cottages, climbing up a steep hill, are often the subject of calendars and postcards. It also has a mill and old bakehouse, converted to a house in 1976. Ponsworthy House, built c.1800, has a porch with Doric columns of granite. At the foot of the hill is the ‘Ponsworthy Splash’, where vehicles must drive through a small stream which runs across the road.

The village is also well known for Ponsworthy Bridge over the West Webburn River. It has a single arch and contains a stone engraved with the dates 1666 and 1792 - believed to be when repairs were carried out.  It was further repaired in 1911. The bridge has a  width restriction, which is one of the reasons the village is so quiet, for it is impassable to modern coaches.

References

External links

Villages in Devon
Dartmoor